Pinkstaff is an unincorporated community in Lawrence County, Illinois, United States.

References

Unincorporated communities in Lawrence County, Illinois
Unincorporated communities in Illinois